Descurainia incana is a species of flowering plant in the mustard family known by the common name mountain tansymustard. It is native to much of North America, including most of Canada, the western United States, and Baja California. It is known from many types of habitat. It is a biennial herb with a slender, greenish, often hairy stem sometimes exceeding a meter tall. The leaves are narrowly to widely oval in shape, the lower ones lobed and sometimes compound, the upper generally unlobed. The mustardlike inflorescence is a series of developing fruits beneath an elongating cluster of small bright yellow flowers. The fruit is a thin, pointed silique up to 2 centimeters long.

External links
Jepson Manual Treatment
USDA Plants Profile
Photo gallery

incana
Flora of the Western United States
Flora of Baja California
Flora of California
Flora of the Sierra Nevada (United States)
Flora of Western Canada
Plants described in 1835
Flora without expected TNC conservation status